Dayton is a neighborhood within the city of Newark in Essex County, New Jersey. It is part of the city's south ward and was named after Jonathan Dayton, a Founding Father of the United States.  

The area is bounded on the north by Peddie Street (Thomas Baldwin Peddie), on the east by Newark Liberty International Airport, on the south by Elizabeth, and on the west by Elizabeth Avenue.  The main road through the neighborhood is Frelinghuysen Avenue, but it is surrounded by U.S. Route 1/9, Interstate 78 and U.S. Route 22. The neighborhood of Dayton encompasses all of Weequahic Park, the second largest park in Newark.  The park includes an  lake, Weequahic Golf Course and an old racetrack now used for jogging.  The park has gospel and jazz concerts at night. The park is bisected by US 22 and the larger, southern section of the park (including Weequahic Lake) is easily accessible to Dayton.

Jonathan Dayton (October 16, 1760October 9, 1824) was an American politician from the U.S. state of New Jersey. He was the youngest person to sign the United States Constitution and a member of the U.S. House of Representatives, serving as the fourth Speaker of the United States House of Representatives, and later the U.S. Senate.

Years ago, the area of Dayton was also known for Twin City, a skating rink located on the Newark-Elizabeth border in the area of Virginia Street. St.Thomas Aquinas RC Church is located on Ludlow St.

There is one train station in Dayton, Newark Liberty International Airport, served by New Jersey Transit's Northeast Corridor Line and North Jersey Coast Line, and Amtrak's Northeast Regional and Keystone Service. The station was built in 2001 to connect NJT's commuter lines and Amtrak's Northeast Corridor services with the airport's AirTrain system. It opened four years after service was run between terminals on the AirTrain.  The station is only a transfer station and not publicly accessible by any roads. Proposal to extend PATH service to the airport may include a station at Dayton.

Proposed Dayton PATH station
Proposal to extend PATH service to the airport may include a station a new PATH station on Frelinghuysen Avenue near its intersection with Haynes Avenue.

Lionsgate Newark in Dayton
In 2022, the city announced that a major new film and television production studio overlooking Weequahic Park and Weequahic Golf Course, to be called "Lionsgate Newark," would open in 2024 on the 15-acre former Seth Boyden housing projects site at 101 Center Terrace in the Dayton section near Evergreen Cemetery. Lionsgate Newark will partner on public relations and community affairs with the New Jersey Performing Arts Center.

See also
Newark City Cemetery
Mount Olivet Cemetery, Newark

References

Neighborhoods in Newark, New Jersey